Volim biti zaljubljena is the third album by Croatian singer Lana Jurčević. It was released in 2008, by Menart Records. The main song, "Volim biti zaljubljena", was featured on the Croatian TV show Nad lipom 35, along with "Pronađi me".

Track listing 

 Volim biti zaljubljena - 4:36
 Miljama daleko - 3:32
 Zaćaran - 4:11
 Zora bijela - 4:49
 Ponovo- 3:25
 Ostavi žaljenje- 4:48
 Pronađi me - 3:05
 Otrov - 3:47
 Okovi na srcu - 3:23
 Zakon ljubavi - 4:18
 Marija - 3:05
 Zora bijela (remix) - 4:07

References

2008 albums
Lana Jurčević albums
Croatian-language albums
Menart Records albums